Julian Georgiev Popov (born in 1959 in Sofia, Bulgaria) is a Bulgarian-British public figure and writer. In 2013 he was Bulgarian government minister. He is the author of the book English Bulgaria or Switzerland in the Balkans (2004), the novel Island of Mists (2006), co-author of the books "The European Supergrid" and "Energy and Climate Diplomacy" and of many comment and opinion articles on energy policies, European integration, low-carbon economy and international relations for the Bulgarian, British (BBC Three, The Independent, Financial Times, Huffington Post, The Scotsman), Polish and other European media. as well as for Al Jazeera. Popov has been an advocate for minority groups in Bulgaria, starting a campaign to remove a racist anti-Roma group from Facebook and writing articles (for instance for Aljazeera) on the maltreatment of Roma minority in Bulgaria and across Europe.

He is fellow of the European Climate Foundation, Chairman of the Board of Directors of the Buildings Performance Institute Europe, Chairman of the Board of the "Elizabeth Kostova Foundation" for creative writing, and until becoming Cabinet Minister in 2013 served as Chairman of the Board of the Bulgarian School of Politics and as a member of the board of the American University in Bulgaria,. He is member of the Board of Trustees of the New Bulgarian University and Director and Treasurer of the British charity Friends of Bulgaria. He was also the founding CEO of the New Bulgarian University where he introduced distance education to Bulgaria. In 2006 he created the first political blog in the Bulgarian language.

Popov was appointed the Minister of Environment and Water in the caretaker government of Bulgaria on 13 March 2013. He left office on 29 May of that year.

In 2016 he was recognised as one of the 40 most influential voices in European energy policy under N24 by the Brussels media service EurActiv.

References

External links 
 Elizabeth Kostova Foundation
 Bulgarian School of Politics
 Julian Popov website

1959 births
Living people
British male journalists
British writers
Bulgarian writers
Bulgarian expatriates in England